Adisham (formerly Adesham) is a village and civil parish in the English county of Kent. It is twinned with Campagne-lès-Hesdin in France.

Geography
The village centre, six miles south-east of Canterbury is on the B2046 road between Wingham and Barham. It was known as Edesham in the Domesday Book.

A clustered village, the cluster is within  from the central cluster of Aylesham.

The village lies on one of the routes that formed part of the Pilgrims' Way immortalised by Geoffrey Chaucer in his book The Canterbury Tales. In 2010, this was the subject of a villagers' protest when local landowner and former banker to the Queen, Timothy Steel, tried to ban walkers from part of the route. After a public enquiry, public rights of way were Council-designated on paths on his land including the path of the former Pilgrims Way.

Amenities

The village church is dedicated to Holy Innocents, and dates to around the late 12th century. A Church of England primary school also serves the village.

The water tower was built in 1903 and is a Grade II listed building.

The village hall was built in 1908 and is still used regularly for public events, including parish council meetings and a Big Breakfast event held on the first Saturday of every month.

Adisham Recreation Ground was opened to the public in 1921, and is situated behind the village hall.

Adisham's village shop shut down in 2004 and the Bull's Head pub closed around 2010.

Transport
Adisham railway station opened on 22 July 1861. It is on the Chatham Main Line - Dover Branch. There is also a daily bus service to Canterbury.

Notable residents
The Rector of Adisham in the archdiocese of Canterbury, Master John "The Martyr" Bland. Bland was a Protestant minister during the reign of Queen Mary I, who had him burned at the stake on 12 July 1555, being found guilty of heresy.

The agricultural pioneer John Reynolds, who introduced the Swedish turnip, or swede, into England, lived at Adisham.

See also
Adisham Hall - a monastery in Sri Lanka

References

External links
 
 
 Kent Archeological Society has the 1841-1901 census returns.

Villages in Kent
City of Canterbury
Civil parishes in Kent
Hamlets in Kent